The Luxior was a French automobile manufactured from 1912 until 1914.  A four-cylinder from Vincennes, it had a 1779 cc engine and was one of the first light cars to be offered as a saloon.  In 1912 the company also produced a 1767 cc model advertised as having a "valveless pre-compression engine with superimposed cylinders".

References
David Burgess Wise, The New Illustrated Encyclopedia of Automobiles

Defunct motor vehicle manufacturers of France
French companies established in 1912